SUC may refer to:
 Suç, a municipality in the Mat District, Dibër County, northern Albania
 Sucs (food)
 Screwed Up Click
 State university and college (Philippines)
 Sutton Common railway station, London, National Rail station code
 Swiss University Conference
 Southern University College, a private non-profit university college in Malaysia
 Société des usines Chausson, the parent company of SECAN

See also
 Succ (disambiguation)